Giles Bryan Chichester (born 29 July 1946) is a British Conservative Party politician who was a Member of the European Parliament (MEP) for South West England and Gibraltar from 1999 until he retired 2014. He was elected as Vice-President of the European Parliament on 6 July 2011 to replace Silvana Koch-Mehrin who had resigned over plagiarism allegations.

Chichester was born in London and educated at Westminster School and Christ Church, Oxford. Since 1969, he has worked in the family business, Francis Chichester Ltd (publishers of maps, guides and educational wallcharts), founded by his father Sir Francis Chichester KBE, and still lives in the family home at 9 St James's Place, London SW1.

He was MEP for Devon and East Plymouth from 1994 to 1999 and represented South West England in the European Parliament from 1999 until 2014. On 23 July 2004 he was elected chair of the Parliamentary Committee on Industry, Research and Energy.

He is a former Chairman of the Carlton Club Political Committee and is chairman of his family business publishing maps.

Chichester describes himself as a "climate change sceptic".

Expenses
On 5 June 2008, Chichester voluntarily stepped down as Leader of the Conservative MEPs in order to clear his name after it was alleged that since 1996 he had wrongly sent European parliamentary funds for secretarial and office services through his family business of which he was a paid director: he was succeeded by his deputy, Philip Bushill-Matthews. Chichester insisted it was his understanding that the contract had been accepted by the EU Parliament in 1999 and in 2004, and that he transferred money for his political staff through the company simply as an easier means of administration. The European Parliament suggested that a change in the Financial Regulation in 2003 meant this arrangement could constitute a potential conflict of interest.

The situation arose while as Leader of the Conservative MEPs Cameron had tasked Chichester to review and compile a code of conduct for Conservative MEPs' expenses after the embarrassment of MP Derek Conway. However, Chichester admitted that once he had been told the contract was not in order he cancelled it immediately and described it as a "whoopsy-daisy" surprise to him.

Chichester stood again successfully for re-election as an MEP in 2009.

References

External links
Profile on European Parliament website
CHICHESTER, Giles Bryan, Who's Who 2013, A & C Black, 2013; online edn, Oxford University Press, Dec 2012

1946 births
Living people
People educated at Westminster School, London
Alumni of Christ Church, Oxford
Businesspeople from London
Conservative Party (UK) MEPs
MEPs for England 1994–1999
MEPs for England 1999–2004
MEPs for England 2004–2009
MEPs for England 2009–2014
Politicians from London